The 1956 season of the Paraguayan Primera División, the top category of Paraguayan football, was played by 8 teams. The national champions were Olimpia.

Results

First stage

Second stage

National title play-offs

External links
Paraguay 1956 season at RSSSF

Para
Primera
Paraguayan Primera División seasons